Poehler is a surname. Notable people with the surname include:

Amy Poehler (born 1971), American actress and comedian, sister of Greg
Greg Poehler (born 1974), American actor and comedian, brother of Amy
Henry Poehler (1833–1912), A representative from Minnesota in 1872

German-language surnames
Surnames of German origin